Lakins Island is an island in Delaware County, New York. It is located east of Hancock, on the East Branch Delaware River.

References

River islands of New York (state)
Landforms of Delaware County, New York
Islands of the Delaware River